SD Gundam G Generation Over World is PSP video game in the SD Gundam G Generation series with an original story as well as the scattered stories mode as in previous games.

Gameplay
The player begins the game with a weak Flagship and several original Pilots and units. You then choose which stage you want to play, and you will need to play the early stages in order to reveal the later stages. After you finish the stages in a chapter, you will be able to play a boss map to conclude a chapter. The grades go as follows: A, B, C, and D, as well as a final boss mission.

Alternatively, you can play the original story mode that will put you on a more difficult series of battles than the scatter story mode.

There are three modes that show the true ending of the game if completed. Core Mode is unlocked by finishing Rank mode (Scatter Mission Mode), Overworld Mode by finishing the extra missions and Core Mode, which contains the final battle of the main saga , and Hell Mode, the final mode of the game, and shows the truth about the story of the game and serves as the epilogue of the saga and therefore, the true ending.

Like the other games in the series, your unit gain XP from destroying enemies and when they gain certain level, you can upgrade them to new units or barter them for units outside of their series or development cycle.

Master Pilots also return to this game. This time, they all have very powerful abilities that can really change the pace of the battles. For instance, there are abilities to recharge allied unit energy as well as health and also give the ability to use map attacks after movement.

It is basically still the same game, but with a lot more featured and enhanced visuals and story. The game is very much like Super Robot Wars and the other SD G Generation games, having a grid with a top-down view that is used to encompass the combat including small movies with various animations for different MS.

The game's stages regardless of what campaign you choose will have a 'Break mission' and 'Challenge Mission' to complete optionally. If you complete the Break mission, you can trigger different series' characters to enter the stage and other events to occur. The Challenge mission adds in 'Secret' enemies that give you 2-5 grunt units if you defeat the commander. Otherwise, the stage abruptly ends when all the enemies are destroyed.

A third 'Break mission' is 'Over Impact'. If the guest commander defeats the enemy commander in the determined limit of turns, all guest characters change to orange and act as enemies. 'Over Impact' only affects the main world. A variant that appears outside the main world is 'Core Impact'. In Core Impact, the player's units are randomly chosen to appear as enemies in points around the map.

Featured Series
Mobile Suit Gundam
Mobile Suit Gundam MS IGLOO
Mobile Suit Gundam: The 08th MS Team
Mobile Suit Gundam 0080: War in the Pocket
Mobile Suit Gundam 0083: Stardust Memory
Advance of Zeta: The Flag of the Titans
Mobile Suit Zeta Gundam
Gundam Sentinel
Mobile Suit Gundam ZZ
Mobile Suit Gundam: Char's Counterattack
Mobile Suit Gundam Unicorn
Mobile Suit Gundam: Hathaway's Flash
Mobile Suit Gundam F90
Mobile Suit Gundam Silhouette Formula 91
Mobile Suit Gundam F91
Mobile Suit Crossbone Gundam
Mobile Suit Crossbone Gundam: Skullheart
Mobile Suit Crossbone Gundam: Steel Seven
Mobile Suit Victory Gundam
Mobile Fighter G Gundam
New Mobile Report Gundam Wing
New Mobile Report Gundam Wing Dual Story: G-Unit
New Mobile Report Gundam Wing: Endless Waltz
After War Gundam X
Turn A Gundam
Mobile Suit Gundam SEED
Mobile Suit Gundam SEED ASTRAY
Mobile Suit Gundam SEED X ASTRAY
Mobile Suit Gundam SEED Destiny
Mobile Suit Gundam SEED C.E.73 Stargazer
Mobile Suit Gundam 00
Mobile Suit Gundam 00 The Movie: A Wakening of the Trailblazer
Mobile Suit Gundam AGE
Model Suit Gunpla Builders Beginning G

Development

References

External links
Official Website

SD Gundam